The Last Ferry is a 1989 Polish drama film directed by Waldemar Krzystek. It was screened in the Un Certain Regard section at the 1990 Cannes Film Festival.

Plot
Poland 1981. There is a growing economic and political crisis in the country. The "Wilanów" ferry leaves from Świnoujście to Hamburg with a trip around the Baltic cities. However, its participants are only interested in the first port on the route - Hamburg, where almost all plan to leave the ship and stay in the West. However, halfway to the ferry, the news about the introduction of martial law in the country and an order to return to the country arrives. At the news of the return, passengers raise a kind of revolt and start lowering the lifeboats on their own, so as not to return. The drama of the situation increases when German cutters approach the ship, informing people on board about the situation in Poland through megaphones. Passengers start jumping straight into the sea. In one of the last scenes, on the empty ferry calling at the port, there are only those who could not escape - the crew, a few passengers and a dog.

The plot of the film is interwoven with the story of a high school teacher, Marek Ziarno, whose task is to smuggle important documents related to NSZZ "Solidarność" to the West and its duel with Służba Bezpieczeństwa (secret service) agents on the ferry who tried to prevent it.

Cast
 Krzysztof Kolberger - Marek Ziarno
 Agnieszka Kowalska - Renata
 Dorota Segda - Kasia Trelkowska
 Ewa Wencel - Ewa
 Artur Barciś - Rysiek
 Jerzy Zelnik - Andrzej
 Aleksander Bednarz - First officer Stefan
 Miroslaw Konarowski - Michal Walewski
 Maciej Robakiewicz - Steward
 Feliks Szajnert - SB officer Stalinski
 Anna Ciepielewska - Marecka
 Barbara Grabowska - Jola
 Leonard Andrzejewski - Commerade Zdzislaw Marecki
 Leon Niemczyk - Captain

References

External links

1989 films
1980s Polish-language films
1989 drama films
Films directed by Waldemar Krzystek
Polish drama films